Yzengremer is a commune in the Somme département in Hauts-de-France in northern France.

Geography
It is 4.7 miles (7.5 km) away from the Channel coast, near the former Route nationale 25 (now RD 925) between Abbeville and Tréport.

Access to the village can be made from the autoroutes A16 (Paris-Dunkerque) and A28 (Abbeville-Rouen).

Population

Economy
The economy is based around agriculture, including cereals, sugar beet, fodder and cattle.

Sites and monuments
The commune contains the Eglise Saint-Médard, which is dated to the 15th century, and a 17th-century château,  a rectangular brick and stone building flanked by a single wing at right angles. A front-central section of each facade was added in the 19th century. An old locksmith works, dating from the late 19th to mid-20th century, is listed on the French Ministry of Culture's inventory of cultural heritage along with the gardens of the Château d'Yzengremer.

See also
Communes of the Somme department

References

External links

History

Communes of Somme (department)